Milejowice may refer to the following places in Poland:
Milejowice, Lower Silesian Voivodeship (south-west Poland)
Milejowice, Świętokrzyskie Voivodeship (south-central Poland)
Milejowice, Masovian Voivodeship (east-central Poland)